Ioannis Kefalogiannis (6 December 1933 – 20 January 2012) was a Greek politician who served as a Member of Parliament from 1958 to 1964, and again from 1974 to 2004. During this time he was briefly Minister of Public Order, Minister for Tourism, and Minister of the Interior. His daughter is the Cabinet Minister Olga Kefalogianni.

Legal oroblems 
Greek Special Crimes Task Force officials accused Kefalogiannis of asking them to alter their deposition against a cannabis grower so that he could be acquitted, in exchange for the appointment of an officer's wife in a public service post and a favorable treatment for all of them within the police force. Kefalogiannis dismissed accusations, putting them down to a plot against him.

The case took place in late 2003, when Kefalogiannis was still a deputy of the governing New Democracy party.

Trial and sentence 
On 23 September 2008, Kefalogiannis was found guilty in a Rethymno city court of attempting to harbor a criminal and of instigating others to commit perjury; Kefalogiannis received a one-year suspended prison sentence. Kefalogiannis denied all the charges and said he would appeal. He accused the prosecutor of attempting to slander his name and claimed the trial was politically motivated.

The prime minister's office announced that Kefalogiannis would abstain from his duty as the prime minister's advisor until the probe was completed. Nevertheless, Kefalogiannis' case caused great discomfort to Costas Karamanlis' government. On 19 December 2008, the appeal was heard and Kefalogiannis was sentenced to a 5-mοnth suspended prison sentence.

References

|-

|-

|-

1933 births
2012 deaths
People from Anogeia
National Radical Union politicians
New Democracy (Greece) politicians
Ministers of the Interior of Greece
Ministers of Tourism of Greece
Greek MPs 1958–1961
Greek MPs 1961–1963
Greek MPs 1963–1964
Greek MPs 1974–1977
Greek MPs 1977–1981
Greek MPs 1981–1985
Greek MPs 1985–1989
Greek MPs 1989 (June–November)
Greek MPs 1989–1990
Greek MPs 1990–1993
Greek MPs 1993–1996
Greek MPs 1996–2000
Greek MPs 2000–2004
National and Kapodistrian University of Athens alumni
Politicians from Crete
Ministers of Public Order of Greece